The Saint Helena Progressive Party was a political party on the island of Saint Helena (a British crown colony). The party favoured retaining economic links with the United Kingdom.

The Saint Helena Progressive Party was founded in 1973. Its founders included eleven out of twelve members of the Legislative Council of Saint Helena elected in 1972. The emergence of political parties on Saint Helena followed an increase in political awareness of the population on the island, after economic stringency measures had been adopted as a consequence of increased international inflation.

The Saint Helena Progressive Party won eleven out of twelve Legislative Council seats in the September 1976 election. The party appears to have become defunct around 1976, at a similar point in time as its adversary the Saint Helena Labour Party.

References 

1973 establishments in Saint Helena and Dependencies
Political parties in Saint Helena
Political parties established in 1973